Enrique González Rojo (born Culiacán, 1899 – died Mexico City, May 9, 1939) was a Mexican writer.

Biography 
González Martínez was the son of the poet Enrique González Martínez and his wife Luisa Rojo. He had two siblings. He worked for the magazines San-Ev-Ank (1918) and the Revista Nueva (1919), was director of the literary section of the paper El Heraldo de México (1920) and was chief of the department of fine arts of the Secretaría de Educación Pública from 1923 to 1924. He was co-founder of the magazine Contemporáneos.

Selected works / publications 
 El puerto y otros poemas, 1923
 Espacio, 1926
 Viviendas en el mar, 1927
 Romance of José Conde, 1939
 Elegías romanas y otros poemas, 1941 (posthumously)
 Obra completa, 2002 (posthumously)

References 

20th-century Mexican writers
20th-century Mexican male writers
Writers from Sinaloa
People from Culiacán
1899 births
1939 deaths